Forestburg Independent School District is a public school district based in the community of Forestburg, Texas (USA).

The district has one school Forestburg High School that serves students in grades pre-kindergarten through twelve.

Academic achievement
In 2009, the school district was rated "recognized" by the Texas Education Agency.

Special programs

Athletics
Forestburg High School High School plays six-man football.

See also

List of school districts in Texas

References

External links

School districts in Montague County, Texas